Stomopteryx elaeocoma is a moth of the family Gelechiidae. It was described by Edward Meyrick in 1918. It is found in South Africa.

The wingspan is 11–12 mm. The forewings are dark fuscous finely sprinkled with whitish. The stigmata are blackish, the discal approximated, the plical obliquely before the first discal. The hindwings are light bluish grey.

References

Endemic moths of South Africa
Moths described in 1918
Stomopteryx